Charlie Peter Mirabal (born April 2, 1987) is a Venezuelan born Colombian professional baseball infielder for Parma Baseball 1949 in the Italian Baseball League.

Mirabal was selected to the roster for the Colombia national baseball team in the 2015 Pan American Games, 2016 South American Championships and 2017 World Baseball Classic.

References

External links

1987 births
Living people
Albuquerque Isotopes players
Amarillo Thunderheads players
Arizona League Dodgers players
Baseball infielders
Baseball players at the 2015 Pan American Games
Dominican Summer League Dodgers players
Venezuelan expatriate baseball players in the Dominican Republic
Great Lakes Loons players
Ogden Raptors players
Parma Baseball Club players
Rancho Cucamonga Quakes players
Sonoma Stompers players
Baseball players from Caracas
Venezuelan expatriate baseball players in the United States
Venezuelan expatriate baseball players in Italy
Venezuelan people of Colombian descent
2017 World Baseball Classic players
Pan American Games competitors for Venezuela